Mohammed bin Awad bin Laden (1908 – 3 September 1967) was a Yemeni-born Saudi billionaire businessman working primarily in the construction industry. He founded what is today the Saudi Binladin Group and became the wealthiest non-royal Saudi, establishing the wealth and prestige of the Bin Laden family. He was the son of Awad bin Laden and the father of Osama bin Laden.

Life 
Muhammad bin Awad, bin Laden was born on the Hadhramaut coast of south Yemen in 1908 to Awad, a Kindite Hadhrami tribesman from al-Rubat, a village in Wadi Doan; Mohammed's paternal grandfather was Aboud, the son of Ali, one of four brothers (the others being Ahmed, Mansour, and Zaid) from whom the four Banu Laden clans trace their ancestry.

Poor and uneducated, his family emigrated to Tihamah before World War I. According to Eric Margolis, he initially worked as a porter in Jeddah, like many other impoverished Yemenite emigrants of that time. However, Salon.com reports that his first job was as a bricklayer with Aramco. In 1930, he started his own construction business and after coming to the attention of Abdul Aziz Ibn Saud, first monarch of Saudi Arabia, he eventually achieved such success that his family became known as "the wealthiest non-royal family in the kingdom."

Mohammed bin Laden's enormous financial success was ascribed to a shrewd business sense, fealty to Saudi Arabia's rulers, reliability and a willingness to offer the lowest bid on construction contracts. By undercutting local construction firms he won contracts to build palaces for the House of Saud.

As the "royal builder," Mohammed bin Laden forged close relationships with the royal family, particularly Prince Faisal of Saudi Arabia. In 1964, Prince Faisal deposed his half-brother, King Saud, and began rebuilding the kingdom after the wasteful excesses of the Saud era. King Faisal accepted Mohammed bin Laden's offer of financial assistance to support the national economy and as a reward, King Faisal issued a royal decree awarding all future construction projects to bin Laden's construction company. As a result, bin Laden's company eventually amassed assets in excess of US$5 billion.
He made his initial fortune from exclusive rights to all mosque and other religious building construction in Saudi Arabia and several other Arab countries. Until 1967, Mohammed bin Laden held exclusive responsibility for restorations at the Jami Al-Aqsa in Jerusalem.

Despite his royal associations and great wealth, Mohammed bin Laden lived a relatively simple and devout life, demanding that his children observe a strict religious and moral code. In his later years, the bin Laden corporate network diversified its activities beyond construction, largely in foreign investment and oil.

Religion 

He was reportedly raised as a Wahhabi Muslim, noted for his religious devotion and boasted that he could fly by private helicopter to pray at Mecca, Medina and al-Aqsa (in Jerusalem) in the same day.

Wives and children 

He fathered a total of 52 children by 11 wives. He had three wives who mostly remained the same but the fourth wife was said to change frequently. 

His best known son is Osama bin Laden, the founder of al-Qaeda. Osama bin Laden's mother, Hamida al-Attas, was born and raised in Syria before marrying Bin Laden and moving to Saudi Arabia. She was non-traditional, known more for wearing Chanel trouser suits rather than the veiled, conservative attire typical of Saudi women. She was neither Wahhabi nor Saudi, and her foreign origin diminished her status within the conservative Saudi family where she became known as "the slave wife". She  was his last bride, for he died unexpectedly, in a plane crash, in 1967. According to Carmen bin Ladin, Mohammed was planning to wed a 23rd wife the night he died, and was heading there when his plane crashed.

Death 
On 3 September 1967,  Mohammed bin Laden was killed when his airplane, a Beechcraft G18S, crashed during landing in Usran, 'Asir Province, in southwest Saudi Arabia.

Legacy 
Following Mohammed bin Laden's death, his eldest sons, principally Salem bin Laden, renamed the organization, "Binladen Brothers for Contracting and Industry" and continued to expand their late father's company until it employed more than 40,000 people. Salem bin Laden was killed in the United States in 1988 when his ultralight aircraft collided with power lines. Many members of the Bin Laden family have moved away from Saudi Arabia and settled in Europe and the US.

In May 1990, the company was renamed the Saudi Binladin Group under the leadership of Bakr bin Laden. The Saudi Binladin Group as it is now known, is involved in construction, engineering, manufacturing, and telecommunications. Construction projects include airports, housing complexes, tunnels, and bridges. The group is also involved in city planning and real estate development. The Saudi Binladin Group is Egypt's largest private foreign company and negotiated with the Lebanese government to rebuild part of central Beirut under a US $50 million contract.

In 2009, the Bin Laden family was listed as the 5th wealthiest Saudi family by Forbes magazine, with a reported net worth of $7 billion.

Descendants 
Mohammed bin Awad bin Laden's sons:
 Salem bin Laden (1946–1988) married Caroline Carey
 Ali bin Laden
 Thabet bin Laden (d. 2009)
 Mahrous bin Laden
 Hassan bin Laden
 Bakr bin Laden
 Khalid bin Laden
 Yeslam bin Ladin (born 1950) married Carmen Dufour (born 1954)
 Wafah Dufour (born 1978)
 Najia Dufour (born 1979)
 Noor Dufour (born 1987)
 Ghalib bin Laden
 Yahya bin Laden
 Abdul Aziz bin Laden
 Issa bin Laden
 Tarek bin Laden
 Ahmed bin Laden
 Ibrahim bin Laden
 Shafiq bin Laden
 Osama bin Laden (1957–2011) married Najwa Ghanem (born 1960)
 Khalil bin Ladin
 Saleh bin Ladin
 Haider bin Laden
 Saad bin Laden
 Abdullah bin Laden
 Yasser bin Laden
 Mohammad bin Laden (born 1967)

References

20th-century Saudi Arabian businesspeople
Mohammed bin Awad bin Laden
1900s births
1967 deaths
Mohammed
Victims of aviation accidents or incidents in 1967
Victims of aviation accidents or incidents in Saudi Arabia
Yemeni emigrants to Saudi Arabia